Al-Qadir University is a university currently under construction in Sohawa, Pakistan near Islamabad. The project is part of the Al-Qadir University Project Trust. The name of the trust is inspired by one of the names of God, Al-Qadir which means the all-capable and all-powerful. It seeks to produce morally upright and intellectually vibrant leaders of the Muslim Umma. The groundbreaking ceremony for the Al-Qadir University took place on 5 May 2019, at Sohawa, at which the prime minister of Pakistan, Imran Khan, laid the university's foundation stone.

Program
 BS Management
 BS Islamic Studies

References

Educational institutions in Pakistan
Universities and colleges in Jhelum District
Educational institutions established in 2019
2019 establishments in Pakistan
Public universities and colleges in Punjab, Pakistan